Robert Emery may refer to:

 Robert Emery (songwriter) (1794–1871), Tyneside songwriter
 Robert Emery (athlete) (1898–1934), American Olympic sprinter
 Robert Emery (pianist) (born 1983), English pianist, conductor and orchestrator
 Robert E. Emery (born 1952), American psychologist
 Robert W. Emery, former collegiate gymnast
 Robert M. Emery, soldier